Dentistry developed during the early parts of Roman history, possibly due to the arrival of a Greek doctor named Archagathus. Ancient Roman oral surgical tools included the dental drill, chisels, bone levers, tooth and stump forceps. The ancient Romans invented the usage of narcotics during dental surgery. These tools were used to treat conditions such as toothache and to extract teeth. It was believed in ancient Rome that the cause of the conditions that necessitated such treatment was a "toothworm."

History 
According to Pliny the Elder for much of Roman history they lived without a medical community. During this time medicine was confined to popular homemade remedies rather than professional trained doctors. The profession of medicine was introduced to the Romans by the Greek doctor Archagathus, who traveled to Rome and established himself as a physician. Eventually he garnered a reputation for violent use of steel and fire costing him his reputation and granting him the title of "butcher." Archaeological and historical evidence disputes this narrative. The Twelve Tables, which was the set of legislation forming the basis of Roman law, make mention of teeth laden with gold, implying that dentistry had been practiced at this point in history. Other evidence includes the finding of prosthetic materials designed to treat dental and oral health conditions in Roman cities such as Teano. Despite this, historians and archaeologists are inconclusive on this matter.

Cosmetic dentistry 
The ancient Romans whitened their teeth using toothpaste made from human urine and goat milk. Dental bridges and crowns were developed in ancient Rome in 500 BCE. This form of dentistry was a craft the Etruscans were skilled at. This civilization developed the first "true" dental bridges. Roman dental bridges were commonly made of bone or ivory, and were in high demand during the Roman Republic. Ancient Roman dentists also used dental implants made of gold.

Tooth

Toothaches 

Treatments for toothaches were popular and widely desired due to the intense pain and dental decay this condition caused. In his work Natural History, Pliny the Elder discussed therapies for tooth pain. He wrote that a patient could pour the remedy into their ear. Some medication was supposed to be poured into the ear on the same side of the head as the toothache, others were supposed to be poured in on the opposite side. Some treatments included the inhalation of wild mint, the use of hare bones to incise the gums, wearing bones covered with feces, and gargling the ash of deer horns. Another treatment included catching a frog in moonlight and spitting into its mouth, then commanding the frog to leave and carry the toothache with it. Roman doctors believed that toothaches were caused by a "toothworm."

Tooth extraction 
It is unclear which Roman profession or professions would have performed dentistry. There may have been medical specialists trained to perform dental procedures, it is also possible that dentistry was practiced as a subset of other professions, such as barbery. Tooth extraction is an oral surgical procedure conducted for the purpose of removing teeth. In ancient Rome, it may have been practiced by specialists who were not associated with any other medical professionals in ancient Rome. This practice required teeth to be extracted softly, in order to avert the danger involved. This danger also resulted in the practice becoming rare. Ancient literature describes another process dedicated to extracting teeth. In this process, the tooth would be grabbed and rocked until it could be removed with hands. Another practice involved cutting the gum and bone surround a tooth, and then extracting. Celsus, a Roman doctor recommended that physicians should also extract the bone near the teeth, and that they should refuse to extract children's teeth unless they were preventing adult teeth from growing.

Others 
Ancient Roman medical writers believed that teeth could become loose due to root weakness or a gum disease. They would treat this by cauterizing the gums, then covering it in honey swilled with mead. Afterwards medication was placed on the teeth. If the tooth became painful it would be extracted. This procedure would be conducted by "scraping" the tooth in "round order" then shaking the tooth until it could be safely removed.

Cleft lip and palate 
Celsus described treatments for the medical condition known as cleft lip and palate. He wrote that applying a suture and abrasions to the lips was Celsus' suggested method of treating small defects. Larger and more problematic defects were treated using surgical procedure known as flaps. Galen, another Roman doctor likely described either coloboma or facial cleft. To treat this condition he recommended scarifying the skin and unifying the disparate parts of the skin, removing callouses, and then finishing the procedure through sewing and glue. It was believed that a healthy palate was necessary for proper speech. The ancient Romans also killed children with cleft lips, due to the belief that they were possessed by evil spirits.

References 

Ancient Roman medicine
History of dentistry